Prince Aloys of Liechtenstein (Alois Gonzaga Maria Adolf; 17 June 1869, in Hollenegg – 16 March 1955, in Vaduz) was the son of Prince Alfred of Liechtenstein (1842–1907) and Princess Henriette of Liechtenstein (1843–1931), daughter of Alois II of Liechtenstein. The maternal nephew and first cousin, once removed, of Franz I, Prince of Liechtenstein, Prince Aloys renounced his rights to the succession on 26 February 1923, in favor of his son Franz Joseph II.

He was the 1,177th Knight of the Order of the Golden Fleece in Austria.

Marriage and issue
On 20 April 1903, in Vienna, he married Archduchess Elisabeth Amalie of Austria (7 July 1878, in Reichenau – 13 March 1960, in Vaduz). The couple had eight children together.
 Franz Josef II, Prince of Liechtenstein (1906–1989)
 Princess Marie Therese Henriette Aloisia Alfreda Franziska Josepha Julie Adelheid Margarete Annunziata Elisabeth Ignatia Benedikta (14 January 1908, in Vienna – 30 September 1973, in Funchal, Madeira), married in 1944 to Count Artur Strachwitz von Gross-Zauche und Camminetz and had issue.
 Prince Karl Alfred Maria Johannes Baptista Heinrich Aloys Georg Hartmann Ignatius Benediktus Franz Joseph Rochus (16 August 1910, in Schloss Frauenthal – 17 November 1985, in Hainburg an der Donau), married at Schloss Persenbeug on 17 February 1949 Archduchess Agnes Christina of Austria. They had seven children.
 Prince Georg Hartmann Maria Josef Franz de Paula Aloys Ignatius Benediktus Martin (11 November 1911 – 18 January 1998); he married Duchess Marie Christine of Württemberg (daughter of Philipp Albrecht, Duke of Württemberg) in 1948 and had seven children.
 Prince Ulrich Dietmar Maria Franz Ferdinand Karl Aloys Joseph Ignatius Benediktus Johannes Augustinus (29 August 1913, in Gross-Ullersdorf – 13 October 1978, in Meran)
 Princess Maria Henriette Theresia Aloisa Franziska Sophie Josepha Michaela Adelheid Annunziata Elisabeth Ignatia Benedikta et omnes sancti (6 November 1914, in Vienna – 13 October 2011), married in 1943 to Peter Graf von Eltz genannt Faust von Stromberg and had issue.
 Prince Alois Heinrich Maria Franz Joseph Ferdinand Ignatius Benediktus Liberatus Marko d'Aviano (20 November 1917, in Vienna – 14 February 1967, in Kalwang, Styria), unmarried and without issue.
 Prince Heinrich Hartneid Maria Franz de Paula Johann Aloys Joseph Ignatius Benedictus Hilarion (1 October 1920, in Gross-Ullersdorf – 29 November 1993, in Grabs), married in 1968 to Amalie Gräfin von Podstatzky-Lichtenstein and had three children.

References

External links
 Austria-Forum: Liechtenstein, Aloys Prinz

1869 births
1955 deaths
Princes of Liechtenstein
Liechtenstein people of Polish descent
People from Vaduz
20th-century Liechtenstein people
19th-century Liechtenstein people
Knights of the Golden Fleece of Austria